Tateville is an unincorporated community in Pulaski County, Kentucky, United States. Tateville has a post office with ZIP code 42558.

References

Unincorporated communities in Pulaski County, Kentucky
Unincorporated communities in Kentucky